Amata borguensis is a moth of the subfamily Arctiinae. It was described by George Hampson in 1901. It is found in Cameroon and Nigeria.

References

 

borguensis
Moths described in 1901
Moths of Africa